is a Japanese politician.

Overviews 
He was first elected to the House of Representatives in the 1972 general election and represented the Nagano Prefecture first district. Following a revamp of the electoral system, he lost his seat to Kenji Kosaka in the 1996 general election.

Career 

He was born in present-day Nagano City. Originally a member of the Liberal Democratic Party, he co-founded New Party Sakigake in 1993 and served as a senior advisor to Prime Minister Morihiro Hosokawa from 1993 to 1994. He later returned to the LDP and served as Director-General of the Economic Planning Agency under Prime Minister Ryutaro Hashimoto. Tanaka again served as a policy advisor to Hosokawa during his bid for Governor of Tokyo in the 2014 gubernatorial election.

References

1940 births
Living people
People from Nagano Prefecture
Members of the House of Representatives (Japan)
Liberal Democratic Party (Japan) politicians
New Party Sakigake politicians